Lester Henry "Bud" Selves (July 16, 1906 – April 18, 1991) was an American football player and coach. He was inducted into the Kansas State High School Activities Association Hall of Fame in 1978.

Playing career
Selves played offense and defense for the College of Emporia Fighting Presbies in Emporia, Kansas, playing on the undefeated 1928 team coached by L. T. Harr. Selves was selected All-Conference and was also a member of the track team.

Coaching career

McPherson
Selves was the head football coach at McPherson College in McPherson, Kansas. He held that position for the 1936 season. His coaching record at McPherson was 5–3–1.

Assistant coaching
Selves coached under Harr at Kansas State Teachers College and later at the College of Emporia, then later at the high school level.

Head coaching record

References

External links
 

1906 births
1991 deaths
College of Emporia Fighting Presbies football coaches
College of Emporia Fighting Presbies football players
Emporia State Hornets football coaches
McPherson Bulldogs football coaches
College men's track and field athletes in the United States
High school football coaches in Kansas
People from Rice County, Kansas
Players of American football from Kansas